Kallikrateia is a municipal unit in Chalkidiki, Greece. Since the 2011 local government reform it is part of the municipality of Nea Propontida, before which it was a municipality with its seat in the town Nea Kallikrateia. The municipal unit has an area of 108.894 km2. According to the census of 2011, the municipal unit has a population of 11,571 people while the town itself has 7,238 inhabitants, third largest in Chalkidiki.
Nea Kallikrateia was established after the refugee crisis in 1922, mainly by the residents who came from Kallikrateia (today Mimarsinan) in Eastern Thrace and set up in the area, where the metohi of the Xenofontos Monastery of Mount Athos existed and it was called “Stomion”. Many testimonies report that it was inhabited by the prehistoric years; however, they are not confirmed.

Subdivisions
The municipal unit of Kallikrateia consists of the communities of Agios Pavlos, Lakkoma, Nea Gonia, Nea Kallikrateia and Nea Silata.

References

External links

Kallikrateia.gr, a news portal based in Nea Kallikrateia:  

Populated places in Chalkidiki